The Eastern Peripheral Expressway (EPE) or Kundli–Ghaziabad–Palwal Expressway (KGP Expressway) is a  long, 6-lane wide expressway passing through the states of Haryana and Uttar Pradesh in India. The expressway starts from the Western Peripheral Expressway at Kundli, Sonipat, passing through Baghpat, Ghaziabad and Noida districts in UP and Faridabad district in Haryana before rejoining the Western Peripheral Expressway near Dholagarh, Palwal. Eastern Peripheral Expressway along with Western Peripheral Expressway completes the largest Ring Road around Delhi. The Eastern Peripheral Expressway was declared as National Expressway 2 (NE-2) in March 2006.

Eastern Peripheral Expressway is expected to divert more than 50,000 trucks away from Delhi and reduce air pollution in Delhi by 27%. It was inaugurated on 27 May 2018 by Prime Minister Narendra Modi in Baghpat. Eastern Peripheral Expressway  will be connected with Yamuna Expressway via an interchange which is being built at Jaganpur Afzalpur village near Noida International University in Gautam Buddha Nagar district.

Construction
The construction work of 135 km long Eastern Peripheral Expressway was divided into 6 packages and was awarded to 5 different contractors. There are 406 structures including 8 Railway-over-bridges (ROB), 4 major bridges, 46 minor bridges, 2 Toll Plaza, 3 flyovers, 7 interchanges, 70 vehicular-underpasses (VUP), 151 pedestrian-underpasses, and 114 culverts. The total construction cost (excluding land acquisition cost) was ₹4,418 crores. The list of contractors is as follows:

Salient Features

This expressway boasts of many features that are being implemented for the first time in India.
 The 135 km long Expressway has a closed tolling system in which toll will be collected only on the distance travelled, and not on the entire length.
 There is a provision for electronic collection of toll to ensure disruption-free movement of traffic.
 Weigh-in motion sensors on all entry points which ensure that over-loaded vehicles are not allowed to enter the Expressway. The sensors are installed at all entry points with two gates—one leading to the Expressway and the other redirecting the vehicle if it is over-loaded.
 Provision for parking of overloaded trucks where they can unload some of the cargo to satisfy the weight criteria and then move to the Expressway.
 To check for speed, cameras have been put up every 2 kilometers. Over-speeding vehicles will be issued the challan at the toll plaza and the challan amount would be added to the total toll amount.
 Facility for rainwater collection at every 500 meters has been made.
  2.5 lakh trees have been planted along the highway along which will be watered through drip irrigation system
 A cycle track of 2.5 metre has been developed on both sides of the expressway
 Solar panels have been installed at various locations to provide power to illuminate the expressway. 8 solar power plants with a total capacity of 4,000 kilowatts (4 MW) have been made by the side of the expressway. 
 33% of the earthwork on the highway was done using fly ash from coal power plants thereby compounding its contribution to reducing pollution.
 The expressway has 406 structures of which 4 are major bridges, 46 minor bridges, 3 flyovers, 7 interchanges, 221 underpasses and 8 Railway-over-bridges (ROB).

Status Updates

 Sep 2015: Construction work of expressway divided by NHAI into 6 packages and awarded to 5 private firms.
 Nov 2015: Foundation stone of 135-km long expressway laid by PM of India Narendra Modi.
 Feb 2016: Construction work started on expressway.
 Apr 2017: An estimated 60% of the work has been completed. It is expected to be completed by August 2017.
 Jul 2017: Around 70% of the work has been completed. It is expected to be completed by March 2018, 3 months ahead of the deadline of July 2018 set by the Supreme Court of India.
 Oct 2017: Few farmers agitating against land acquisition in Greater Noida area and who forced stop the road construction work were arrested in Sep 2017 and police force are deployed to give cover to road workers so that work can proceed.
 Dec 2017: 85% work completed. Land acquisition related issue is there at two places in Greater Noida impacting length of about 1 kilometer each, which delayed the project completion.
 Apr 2018: The expressway was scheduled to be inaugurated by Indian Prime Minister Narendra Modi on 29 April 2018 but was cancelled due to elections in Karnataka.
 May 2018: The Supreme Court of India has directed the National Highways Authority of India (NHAI) to open the expressway before 31 May 2018.
 May 2018: KGP Expressway is inaugurated by PM Narendra Modi in Baghpat on 27 May 2018.

See also
 Western Peripheral Expressway
 Delhi Meerut Expressway
 Delhi-Amritsar-Katra Expressway 
 Yamuna Expressway
 Environmental issues in Delhi
 Expressways & highways in Haryana
 Expressways in India

References 

Expressways in India
National expressways in India
Roads in Delhi
Expressways in Haryana
Ring roads in India
Expressways in Uttar Pradesh
Transport in Ghaziabad district, India